A statue of Kanō Jigorō is installed outside the Kodokan Judo Institute, in Bunkyō, Tokyo, Japan.

External links
 

Buildings and structures in Bunkyō
Monuments and memorials in Japan
Sculptures of men in Japan
Statues in Japan